Fabio de Miguel (so as: Fanny McNamara and Fabio McNamara; born 8 January 1957, Madrid) is a Spanish artist.

He grew up in the Alameda de Osuna area of Madrid. He was involved in La Movida Madrileña like many of his friends, including Pedro Almodóvar, Olvido Gara (Alaska), Tino Casal and Costus. He has collaborated with them in films and songs.

He later focused on his pop art paintings, which he has exposed in fairs like ARCO and he has talked about  religiosity.

Discography
 Fanny y los + (1986) - Mini-LP.
 A tutti plein (1995) - CD.
 Rockstation (2000) - CD.
 Mi correo electronic... oh! (2000) - CDSG.
 Mariclones (2006) - CD.
 Dangerous Bimbow (2007) - CDSG.
 Requiebros de mujer en el burlaero (2007) - CD.
 El imperio contra Paca (2011) - CD.
 Celebritis (2009) – Digital single.
 Bye Bye Supersonic (2009) - CD.

Filmography
Pepi, Luci, Bom , 1980
Labyrinth of Passion , 1982
Dark Habits , 1983
Historias paralelas,(shortfilm), 1983
Law of Desire , 1987
Tie Me Up! Tie Me Down! , 1990
Kety no para, (TV), 1997

References

External links

1957 births
Living people
Male actors from Madrid
Gay singers
Gay painters
Spanish gay actors
Spanish gay musicians
Spanish gay artists
Spanish LGBT painters
Spanish LGBT singers
Pop artists
Singers from Madrid
Spanish male film actors
Spanish male painters
20th-century Spanish male actors
20th-century Spanish male artists
20th-century Spanish male singers
20th-century Spanish painters